Scythris bolognella is a moth of the family Scythrididae. It was described by Jäckh in 1978. It is found in Italy.

References

bolognella
Moths described in 1978